, also known as , is a Japanese voice actress and narrator.

Biography
After working at Beeface Creative and Osawa Office, she joined Vi-Vo. Hayama reported on her blog she was married on March 29, 2014. In December 2014, she left Vi-Vo and announced on her blog she worked freelance in January 2015. She joined Clare Voice on April 1, 2015.

Filmography

Anime series
2009
Fairy Tail as Laki Olietta
Sora no Manimani as Yoshinari; Yuriko Isoyama
2010
Durarara!! as Arisa
Kuragehime as Waitress
Mitsudomoe as Sakiko Matsuoka
Occult Academy as Waitress
Shiki as Yuki Shiomi
2011
Heaven's Memo Pad as Mika
High Score as Kaori Tachibana
Honto ni Atta! Reibai-Sensei as Motoko Mihoro
Mitsudomoe Zōryōchū! as Sakiko Matsuoka
Oniichan no Koto Nanka Zenzen Suki Janain Dakara ne—!! as Maid
Pocket Monsters: Best Wishes! as Cabernet
Steins;Gate as Maid
2012
Girls und Panzer as Nekonyā
Muv-Luv Alternative: Total Eclipse as Tonya Upenskona
Tari Tari as Mika Sakaki
The Pet Girl of Sakurasou as Research Student B
Pocket Monsters: Best Wishes! Season 2 as Cabernet
Tonari no Kaibutsu-kun as Yayoi
2013
Attack on Titan as Anka Rheinberger
Gargantia on the Verdurous Planet as Pilot
Genshiken Nidaime as Keiko Sasahara
Jewelpet Happiness as Nene Konoe
JoJo's Bizarre Adventure as Announcer
Log Horizon as Elissa
Nagi no Asukara as Yū Seiki
Ore no Nōnai Sentakushi ga, Gakuen Rabu Kome o Zenryoku de Jama Shiteiru as Kanarin
Strike the Blood as Sayaka Kirasaka
Toaru Kagaku no Railgun S as Shinobu Nunotaba
Yozakura Quartet ~Hana no Uta~ as Sawaki
2014
Argevollen as Akino Terai
Witch Craft Works as Atori Kuramine
Wizard Barristers as Diana
Cross Ange as Eleanor, Kaname
JoJo's Bizarre Adventure: Stardust Crusaders as Female Student A

2015
Gate: Jieitai Kanochi nite, Kaku Tatakaeri as Hamilton Uno Law
Shirobako as Tsubaki Andō, Valroph
Is It Wrong to Try to Pick Up Girls in a Dungeon? as Naaza Erisuis

2016
Keijo as Sanae Hououin
BBK/BRNK as Farrah Umlauf

2017
Minami Kamakura High School Girls Cycling Club as Hiroko Azuma
Is It Wrong to Try to Pick Up Girls in a Dungeon? On the Side: Sword Oratoria as Alicia Forestlight

2018
Citrus as Kayo Maruta

2019
Is It Wrong to Try to Pick Up Girls in a Dungeon? II as Naaza Erisuis

2020
Log Horizon: Destruction of the Round Table as Elissa
Is It Wrong to Try to Pick Up Girls in a Dungeon? III as Naaza Erisuis

2022
Vermeil in Gold as Heliodor

Anime films
2015
The Anthem of the Heart as Odagiri
2020
Shirobako: The Movie as Tsubaki Andō

Original video animation
2016
Strike the Blood II as Sayaka Kirasaka
2018
Strike the Blood III as Sayaka Kirasaka
2019
Magimoji Rurumo: The Conclusion as Mimi
2020
Strike the Blood: Kieta Seisō-hen as Sayaka Kirasaka
Strike the Blood IV as Sayaka Kirasaka
2022
Strike the Blood Final as Sayaka Kirasaka

References

External links
  
 Official agency profile 
 

1984 births
Living people
Japanese video game actresses
Japanese voice actresses
Voice actresses from Tokyo